Oh, Susanna! is a 1936 American Western film directed by Joseph Kane and starring Gene Autry, Smiley Burnette, and Frances Grant. Written by Oliver Drake, the film is about a cowboy who is robbed and then thrown from a train by an escaped murderer who then takes on the cowboy's identity.

Plot
Singing cowboy Gene Autry (Gene Autry) is traveling to Mineral Springs Ranch to visit an old friend, Jefferson Lee (Carl Stockdale), whom he hasn't seen in fifteen years. On the train, he is robbed and then thrown from the train by escaped murderer Wolf Benson (Boothe Howard). Believing Gene to be dead, Wolf plans to travel to Mineral Springs Ranch and pose as the radio celebrity in order to collect the $10,000 that Lee owes Gene.

Meanwhile, Gene is rescued by traveling actors Frog Millhouse (Smiley Burnette) and Professor Ezekial Daniels (Earle Hodgins). Together they travel to Sage City, where Gene gets into a fight with Sheriff Briggs (Walter James), who believes he is Wolf, and chokes the singing cowboy. Arrested for Wolf's crimes, Gene is unable to sing in order to prove his identity. At the trial, Gene mouths the words to his songs while a phonograph plays, and after the jury listens, Gene is set free.

Wolf arrives at Lee's Mineral Springs Ranch pretending to be Gene and asks for his money back. Knowing he is an impostor, Lee refuses to give him the money and Wolf shoots him and robs his safe. On his way to Mineral Springs, Gene comes across a posted reward for "Gene Autry", the murderer of Jefferson Lee. Gene meets Lee's niece Mary Ann (Frances Grant), who is riding with Flash Baldwin (Donald Kirke), Wolf's accomplice. Gene notices that Baldwin is wearing his own suit, and decides to pose as Tex Smith, offering to perform at the Lee ranch in place of Gene Autry. After finding his suitcase in Baldwin's room, Gene overhears Wolf's scheme to rob the ranch safe, but Baldwin recognizes Gene's voice by playing his record while he sings.

The next day, while the guests picnic, Wolf and his men crack the ranch safe. Gene pulls a gun on them, but Sheriff Briggs and his posse arrive with Frog and Daniels. He arrests Gene, instead of Wolf, still believing that Gene killed Lee. While the posse locates Mary Ann to implicate Wolf, he deserts his men and Gene overtakes him in his car. Mary Ann then testifies to Gene's innocence and they kiss.

Cast

 Gene Autry as Gene Autry / Tex Smith
 Smiley Burnette as Frog Millhouse
 Frances Grant as Mary Ann Lee
 Earle Hodgins as Professor Ezekial Daniels
 Donald Kirke as Flash Baldwin
 Boothe Howard as Wolf Benson
 The Light Crust Doughboys as Western Band
 Champion as Champion, Autry's Horse
 Clara Kimball Young as Aunt Peggy Lee
 Edward Peil Sr. as Mineral Springs Sheriff
 Frankie Marvin as Henchman Hank
 Carl Stockdale as Jefferson Lee
 Roscoe Gerald as Irate Farmer
 Roger Gray as Sage City Judge
 Fred Burns as Cottonwood Sheriff Jones
 Walter James as Sage City Sheriff Briggs
 Lew Meehan as Henchman Pete
 Fred Snowflake Toones as Train Porter

Production

Stuntwork
 Yakima Canutt
 Tommy Coats
 Jay Wilsey
 Joe Yrigoyen

Filming locations
 Alabama Hills, Lone Pine, California, USA
 Kernville, California, USA
 Saugus Train Depot, Saugus, California, USA

Soundtrack
 "Oh! Susanna" (Stephen Foster) opening credits medley
 "Oh! Susanna" (Stephen Foster) by Gene Autry, Smiley Burnette, and Earle Hodgins (a cappella)
 "Oh! Susanna" (Stephen Foster) by Smiley Burnette (accordion)
 "Oh! Susanna" (Stephen Foster) by The Light Crust Doughboys
 "Jeanie with the Light Brown Hair" (Stephen Foster) opening credits medley
 "Gwine to Rune All Night (De Camptown Races)" (Stephen Foster) opening credits medley
 "Old Folks at Home (Swanee River)" (Stephen Foster) opening credits medley
 "Dear Old Western Skies" (Gene Autry) by Gene Autry
 "Honeymoon Trail" by Gene Autry
 "Tiger Rag" (Edwin B. Edwards, Nick LaRocca, Tony Sbarbaro, Henry Ragas, Larry Shields, Harry DeCosta) by The Light Crust Doughboys
 "They Never Come Through with the Ring" by Smiley Burnette and Earle Hodgins with The Light Crust Doughboys
 "Ride On Vaquero" (Abel Baer, L. Wolfe Gilbert) by The Light Crust Doughboys
 "Water Wheel" (Sam H. Stept) by Gene Autry and Frances Grant with Autry on guitar
 "As Our Pals Ride By" by The Light Crust Doughboys

Memorable quotes
 Gene Autry  Tex Smith: But I tell you, I'm Gene Autry!
Deputy Sheriff: And I'm Bing Crosby. [singing] Boo-boo-boo-boo!
Frog Millhouse: Boo-boo yourself.

References
Citations

Bibliography

External links

 
 
 
 

1936 films
1936 Western (genre) films
1930s romance films
American Western (genre) films
American black-and-white films
American romance films
Films produced by Nat Levine
Republic Pictures films
Films directed by Joseph Kane
1930s English-language films
1930s American films